Ditrigona derocina is a moth in the family Drepanidae. It was described by Felix Bryk in 1943. It is found in Myanmar.

The wingspan is 15–17 mm for males and 17.5–19 mm for females. The wings are white where scaled, but largely colourless and semi-transparent.

References

Moths described in 1943
Drepaninae
Moths of Asia
Taxa named by Felix Bryk